Gérard Gauthier (born September 5, 1948) is a retired National Hockey League linesman. His career started in 1971 and ended in 2003.  During his career, he officiated 2,345 regular season games, 250 playoff games, three All-Star games, two Canada Cups, and six Stanley Cup finals. He also worked the 1998 Nagano Olympics. Gauthier was born in Montreal, Quebec.

Further reading

 The National Hockey League Official Guide & Record Book/1993-94

1948 births
Canadian ice hockey officials
French Quebecers
Living people
National Hockey League officials
Ice hockey people from Montreal